William Scott Cogswell Jr. (born January 14, 1975) is an American politician. He is a member of the South Carolina House of Representatives from the 110th District, serving since 2016. He is a member of the Republican party.

Electoral history

References

Living people
1975 births
Republican Party members of the South Carolina House of Representatives
21st-century American politicians
Sewanee: The University of the South alumni
Columbia University alumni
People from Charleston, South Carolina